The People’s Defence Corps of Yugoslavia or KNOJ, was a corps of the Yugoslav Partisans in charge of internal security of liberated territories during World War II in Yugoslavia and later the territory of Communist Yugoslavia.

KNOJ was created based on a directive by Marshal of Yugoslavia, Josip Broz Tito, on 15 August 1944. As liberated territories expanded, the corps was established to allow Partisan military intelligence organization (Department for People's Protection, OZNA) continued focus on core tasks. The corps comprised about 80,000 men at its peak. The first commander was Jovan Vukotić (1907–1982) and the supervision lay with the political commissar Vlado Janić (1904–1991). KNOJ was rarely used at the front, instead fell under the direction and supervision of OZNA.

In July 1944, just before the formation of KNOJ, there were about 5,000 soldiers in defense units that dealt with security on liberated territories. At the end of World War II in Europe, in May 1945, KNOJ consisted of eight divisions. The basic tasks of the KNOJ were to cleanse the liberated territory from all kinds of enemies, to help the National Liberation Committees in organizing life in the free territory and securing the borders of Yugoslavia. After the end of the war, KNOJ, in cooperation with other security forces, was the basic factor for the security of the country's borders and the destruction of remaining quisling units.

The National Defense Corps of Yugoslavia was disbanded in January 1953, and its jurisdiction was taken over by Yugoslav People's Army (armed forces) and Militia (police forces).

See also 
 OZNA
 Yugoslav People's Army
 State Security Administration (Yugoslavia) (UDBA)
 KOS (Yugoslavia)
 Militia (Yugoslavia)
 Ministry of the Interior (Yugoslavia)
 Operation Gvardijan

References

Literature 

Corps of the Yugoslav Partisans
Law enforcement in Yugoslavia
Anti-fascism in Yugoslavia
1944 establishments in Yugoslavia
1953 disestablishments in Yugoslavia